Pyrrole is a heterocyclic, aromatic, organic compound, a five-membered ring with the formula . It is a colorless volatile liquid that darkens readily upon exposure to air. Substituted derivatives are also called pyrroles, e.g., N-methylpyrrole, . Porphobilinogen, a trisubstituted pyrrole, is the biosynthetic precursor to many natural products such as heme.

Pyrroles are components of more complex macrocycles, including the porphyrinogens and products derived therefrom, including porphyrins of heme, the chlorins, bacteriochlorins, and chlorophylls.

Properties
Pyrrole is a colorless volatile liquid that darkens readily upon exposure to air, and is usually purified by distillation immediately before use. Pyrrole has a nutty odor. Pyrrole is a 5-membered aromatic heterocycle, like furan and thiophene. Unlike furan and thiophene, it has a dipole in which the positive end lies on the side of the heteroatom, with a dipole moment of 1.58 D. In CDCl3, it has chemical shifts at 6.68 (H2, H5) and 6.22 (H3, H4). Pyrrole is an extremely weak base for an amine, with a conjugate acid pKa of −3.8. The most thermodynamically stable pyrrolium cation (C4H6N+) is formed by protonation at the 2 position. Substitution of pyrrole with alkyl substituents provides a more basic molecule—for example, tetramethylpyrrole has a conjugate acid pKa of +3.7. Pyrrole is also weakly acidic at the N–H position, with a pKa of 16.5.
As a hydrogen bonding Lewis acid it is classified as a hard acid and the ECW model lists its acid parameters as EA = 1.38 and CA = 0.68.

History
Pyrrole was first detected by F. F. Runge in 1834, as a constituent of coal tar. In 1857, it was isolated from the pyrolysate of bone. Its name comes from the Greek pyrrhos (“reddish, fiery”), from the reaction used to detect it—the red color that it imparts to wood when moistened with hydrochloric acid.

Occurrence in nature

Pyrrole itself is not naturally occurring, but many of its derivatives are found in a variety of cofactors and natural products. Common naturally produced molecules containing pyrroles include vitamin B12, bile pigments like bilirubin and biliverdin, and the porphyrins of heme, chlorophyll, chlorins, bacteriochlorins, and porphyrinogens. Other pyrrole-containing secondary metabolites include PQQ, makaluvamine M, ryanodine, rhazinilam, lamellarin, prodigiosin, myrmicarin, and sceptrin. The syntheses of pyrrole-containing haemin, synthesized by Hans Fischer was recognized by the Nobel Prize.

Pyrrole is a constituent of tobacco smoke and may contribute to its toxic effects.

Synthesis
Pyrrole is prepared industrially by treatment of furan with ammonia in the presence of solid acid catalysts, like SiO2 and Al2O3.

Pyrrole can also be formed by catalytic dehydrogenation of pyrrolidine.

Laboratory routes
Several syntheses of the pyrrole ring have been described.

Hantzsch pyrrole synthesis

The Hantzsch pyrrole synthesis is the reaction of β-ketoesters (1) with ammonia (or primary amines) and α-haloketones (2) to give substituted pyrroles (3).

Knorr pyrrole synthesis

The Knorr pyrrole synthesis involves the reaction of an α-amino ketone or an α-amino-β-ketoester with an activated methylene compound. The method involves the reaction of an α-aminoketone (1) and a compound containing a methylene group α to (bonded to the next carbon to) a carbonyl group (2).

Paal–Knorr pyrrole synthesis

In the Paal–Knorr pyrrole synthesis, a 1,4-dicarbonyl compound reacts with ammonia or a primary amine to form a substituted pyrrole.

Van Leusen reaction

The Van Leusen reaction can be used to form pyrroles, by reaction of tosylmethyl isocyanide (TosMIC) with an enone in the presence of base, in a Michael addition. A 5-endo cyclization then forms the 5-membered ring, which reacts to eliminate the tosyl group. The last step is tautomerization to the pyrrole.

Barton–Zard synthesis

The Barton–Zard synthesis proceeds in a manner similar to the Van Leusen synthesis. An isocyanoacetate reacts with a nitroalkene in a 1,4-addition, followed by 5-endo-dig cyclization, elimination of the nitro group, and tautomerization.

Piloty–Robinson pyrrole synthesis

The starting materials in the Piloty–Robinson pyrrole synthesis, named for Gertrude and Robert Robinson and Oskar Piloty, are two equivalents of an aldehyde and hydrazine. The product is a pyrrole with substituents at the 3 and 4 positions. The aldehyde reacts with the diamine to an intermediate di-imine (R−C=N−N=C−R). In the second step, a [3,3]-sigmatropic rearrangement takes place between. Addition of hydrochloric acid leads to ring closure and loss of ammonia to form the pyrrole. The mechanism was developed by the Robinsons.

In one modification, propionaldehyde is treated first with hydrazine and then with benzoyl chloride at high temperatures and assisted by microwave irradiation:

Cycloaddition-based routes
Pyrroles bearing multiple substituents are obtained from the reaction of münchnones and alkynes. The reaction mechanism involves 1,3-dipolar cycloaddition followed by loss of carbon dioxide by a retro-Diels–Alder process. Similar reactions can be performed using azalactones.
 

Pyrroles can be prepared by silver-catalyzed cyclization of alkynes with isonitriles, where R2 is an electron-withdrawing group, and R1 is an alkane, aryl group, or ester. Examples of disubstituted alkynes have also been seen to form the desired pyrrole in considerable yield. The reaction is proposed to proceed via a silver acetylide intermediate. This method is analogous to the azide–alkyne click chemistry used to form azoles.

Other methods
One synthetic route to pyrrole involves the decarboxylation of ammonium mucate, the ammonium salt of mucic acid. The salt is typically heated in a distillation setup with glycerol as a solvent.

Biosynthesis of pyrroles
The de novo biosynthesis of pyrrole rings begins with aminolevulinic acid (ALA), which is synthesized from glycine and succinyl-CoA. ALA dehydratase catalyzes the condensation of two ALA molecules via a Knorr-type ring synthesis to form porphobilinogen (PBG). This later reacts to form, for example, the macrocycles heme and chlorophyll. 
 
.

Proline is biosynthetically derived from the amino acid L-glutamate.  Glutamate-5-semialdehyde is first formed by glutamate 5-kinase (ATP-dependent) and glutamate-5-semialdehyde dehydrogenase (which requires NADH or NADPH). This can then either spontaneously cyclize to form 1-pyrroline-5-carboxylic acid, which is reduced to proline by pyrroline-5-carboxylate reductase (using NADH or NADPH), or turned into ornithine by ornithine aminotransferase, followed by cyclisation by ornithine cyclodeaminase to form proline.

Proline can be used as precursor of aromatic pyrroles in secondary natural products, as in prodigiosins. 
The biosynthesis of Prodigiosin involves the convergent coupling of three pyrrole type rings (labeled A, B, and C in figure 1) from L-proline, L-serine, L-methionine,  pyruvate, and 2-octenal.

Ring A is synthesized from L-proline through the nonribosomal peptide synthase (NRPS) pathway (figure 2), wherein the pyrrolidine ring of proline is oxidized twice through FAD+ to yield pyrrole ring A.

Ring A is then expanded via the polyketide synthase pathway to incorporate L-serine into ring B (figure 3). Ring A fragment is transferred from the peptidyl carrier protein  (PCP) to the Acyl Carrier Protein (ACP) by a KS domain, followed by transfer to malonyl-ACP via decarboxylative Claisen condensation. This fragment is then able to react with the masked carbanion formed from the PLP mediated decarboxylation of L-serine, which cyclizes in a dehydration reaction to yield the second pyrrole ring. This intermediate is then modified by methylation (which incorporates a methyl group from L-methionine onto the alcohol at the 6 position) and oxidation of the primary alcohol to the aldehyde to yield the core A–B ring structures.

Reactions and reactivity
Due to its aromatic character, pyrrole is difficult to hydrogenate, does not easily react as a diene in Diels–Alder reactions, and does not undergo usual olefin reactions. Its reactivity is similar to that of benzene and aniline, in that it is easy to alkylate and acylate. Under acidic conditions, pyrroles polymerize easily, and thus many electrophilic reagents that are used in benzene chemistry are not applicable to pyrroles. In contrast, substituted pyrroles (including protected pyrroles) have been used in a broad range of transformations.

Reaction of pyrrole with electrophiles
Pyrroles generally react with electrophiles at the α position (C2 or C5), due to the highest degree of stability of the protonated intermediate. 
 

Pyrroles react easily with nitrating (e.g. HNO3/Ac2O), sulfonating (Py·SO3), and halogenating (e.g. NCS, NBS, Br2, SO2Cl2, and KI/H2O2) agents. Halogenation generally provides polyhalogenated pyrroles, but monohalogenation can be performed. As is typical for electrophilic additions to pyrroles, halogenation generally occurs at the 2-position, but can also occur at the 3-position by silation of the nitrogen. This is a useful method for further functionalization of the generally less reactive 3-position.

Acylation
Acylation generally occurs at the 2-position, through the use of various methods. Acylation with acid anhydrides and acid chlorides can occur without a catalyst; alternatively, a Lewis acid may be used. 2-Acylpyrroles are also obtained from reaction with nitriles, by the Houben–Hoesch reaction. Pyrrole aldehydes can be formed by a Vilsmeier–Haack reaction. N-Acylation of simple pyrrole does not occur.

Alkylation
Electrophilic alkylation of simple pyrrole is uncommon. Alkylation to form enones at C2 has been seen.

Reaction of deprotonated pyrrole
The NH proton in pyrroles is moderately acidic with a pKa of 16.5. Pyrrole can be deprotonated with strong bases such as butyllithium and sodium hydride. The resulting alkali pyrrolide is nucleophilic. Treating this conjugate base with an electrophile such as iodomethane gives N-methylpyrrole. N-Metalated pyrrole can react with electrophiles at the N or C positions, depending on the coordinating metal. More ionic nitrogen–metal bonds (such as with lithium, sodium, and potassium) and more solvating solvents lead to N-alkylation. Nitrophilic metals, such as MgX, lead to alkylation at C (mainly C2), due to a higher degree of coordination to the nitrogen atom. 
In the cases of N-substituted pyrroles, metalation of the carbons is more facile. Alkyl groups can be introduced as electrophiles, or by cross-coupling reactions.
 

Substitution at C3 can be achieved through the use of N-substituted 3-bromopyrrole, which can be synthesized by bromination of N-silylpyrrole with NBS.

Reductions
Pyrroles can undergo reductions to pyrrolidines and to pyrrolines. For example, Birch reduction of pyrrole esters and amides produced pyrrolines, with the regioselectivity depending on the position of the electron-withdrawing group.

Cyclization reactions
Pyrroles with N-substitution can undergo cycloaddition reactions such as [4+2]-, [2+2]-, and [2+1]-cyclizations. Diels-Alder cyclizations can occur with the pyrrole acting as a diene, especially in the presence of an electron-withdrawing group on the nitrogen. Vinylpyrroles can also act as dienes.
 

Pyrroles can react with carbenes, such as dichlorocarbene, in a [2+1]-cycloaddition. With dichlorocarbene, a dichlorocyclopropane intermediate is formed, which breaks down to form 3-chloropyridine (the Ciamician–Dennstedt rearrangement).

Commercial uses
Polypyrrole is of some commercial value.  N-Methylpyrrole is a precursor to N-methylpyrrolecarboxylic acid, a building-block in pharmaceutical chemistry.  Pyrroles are also found in several drugs, including atorvastatin, ketorolac, and sunitinib.  Pyrroles are used as lightfast red, scarlet, and carmine pigments.

Analogs and derivatives
Structural analogs of pyrrole include:
 Pyrroline, a partially saturated analog with one double bond
 Pyrrolidine, the saturated hydrogenated analog

Derivatives of pyrrole include indole, a derivative with a fused benzene ring.

See also

 Simple aromatic rings
 Tetrapyrrole
 Polypyrrole
 Azonine

References

Further reading

External links
 Synthesis of pyrroles (overview of recent methods)
 Substitution reaction mechanisms of nitrogen-containing heteroaromatics